Lo Kong Wai (born 19 June 1992 in Hong Kong) is a Hong Kong professional footballer who currently plays as a winger for Hong Kong Premier League club Sham Shui Po.

Club career
He joined Hong Kong Third Division club Sham Shui Po when he was young. In 2008, youth team members were all promoted to the club's first team to gain experience. In the first season, the club reached the final of Junior Shield, which they eventually lost 0–2 to Sha Tin. Wong Wai played all 6 games and scored a goal in the quarter-finals.

Lo helped the club gain promotion to the First Division for the first time in club history by scoring 5 goals in 15 games in the 2010–11 season. In the 2011–12 season, he failed to help the team prevent relegation to the Second Division. However, he was notable for scoring a goal from South China in the first leg of quarter-finals in Senior Shield, helping the team gain a 1–1 draw.

He followed former Sham Shui Po players and manager Lee Chi Kin and joined Yokohama FC Hong Kong in July 2012.

Lo joined defending First Division champions South China for an undisclosed fee on 28 June 2013.

On 7 July 2017, Eastern announced via Facebook that they had signed Lo.

On 4 June 2018, it was reported that Lo had signed with fellow HKPL side R&F. This was confirmed by Eastern chairman Peter Leung on 19 July 2018, who also stated that his team could not compete with R&F's offer to double Lo's salary to HKD$100,000 a month.

On 29 May 2020, Lo confirmed that he would be leaving R&F after two years. However, on 12 September 2020, Lo was re-signed to a short term contract until the end of the 2019–20 season.

On 2 November 2020, it was announced that Lo had finalized an agreement to return to Sham Shui Po.

Career statistics

Club
 As of 4 May 2013

Notes
1.  Others include Hong Kong Third Division Champion Play-off.
2.  Since Sham Shui Po was competing in lower divisions, they could only join the Junior Shield instead of Senior Shield.
3.  Hong Kong Junior Challenge Shield was not held in the 2009–10 season.

International
As of 7 June 2015. Scores and results list Hong Kong's goal tally first.

Honours

Club
South China
 Hong Kong Senior Shield: 2013–14

Pegasus
 Hong Kong FA Cup: 2015–16
 Hong Kong Sapling Cup: 2015–16

Personal life
Outside of football, Lo is a tech entrepreneur who operates an online store aimed at helping pro-democracy affiliated businesses in Hong Kong to sell surplus merchandise in bulk, at below market prices.

References

External links
 
 Lo Kong Wai at HKFA
 

1992 births
Living people
Association football midfielders
Hong Kong First Division League players
Hong Kong Premier League players
Hong Kong footballers
Hong Kong international footballers
Sham Shui Po SA players
Yokohama FC Hong Kong players
South China AA players
Eastern Sports Club footballers
R&F (Hong Kong) players
Footballers at the 2014 Asian Games
Asian Games competitors for Hong Kong